The men's coxed pair competition at the 1972 Summer Olympics in Munich took place from 27 August to 2 September at the Olympic Regatta Course in Oberschleißheim. There were 21 boats (63 competitors) from 21 nations, with each nation limited to a single boat in the event. The event was won by East German crew Wolfgang Gunkel, Jörg Lucke, and coxswain Klaus-Dieter Neubert; it was the first medal in the event for East Germany as a separate nation. Czechoslovakia (silver) and Romania (bronze) also won their first medals in the men's coxed pair.

Background

This was the 13th appearance of the event. Rowing had been on the programme in 1896 but was cancelled due to bad weather. The men's coxed pair was one of the original four events in 1900, but was not held in 1904, 1908, or 1912. It returned to the programme after World War I and was held every Games from 1924 to 1992, when it (along with the men's coxed four) was replaced with the men's lightweight double sculls and men's lightweight coxless four.

Two of the 18 competitors from the 1968 coxed pair Final A returned: rower Wolfgang Gunkel and coxswain Klaus-Dieter Neubert from the fourth-place East German boat. They, along with new second rower Jörg Lucke (a 1968 coxless pairs Olympic champion), had won the 1971 European championship and were among the favorites. Another top team was the Czechoslovakian boat, brothers Oldřich Svojanovský and Pavel Svojanovský and cox Vladimír Petříček; they had won the 1969 European title. The Romanian crew, Ștefan Tudor, Petre Ceapura, and cox Ladislau Lovrenschi, were the reigning (1970) World Champions.

Canada and Norway each made their debut in the event. France and the United States each made their 11th appearance, tied for most among nations to that point.

Competition format

The coxed pair event featured three-person boats, with two rowers and a coxswain. It was a sweep rowing event, with the rowers each having one oar (and thus each rowing on one side). The course used the 2000 metres distance that became the Olympic standard in 1912. This rowing competition consisted of three main rounds (quarterfinals, semifinals, and finals), as well as a repechage round that allowed teams that did not win their quarterfinal heats to advance to the semifinals.

 Heats: Four heats. With 21 boats entered, there were 5 or 6 boats per heat. The top boat in each heat (total of 4 boats) advanced directly to the semifinals; all other boats (17 boats) went to the repechage.
 Repechage: Four heats. There were 4 or 5 boats in each heat. The top two boats in each heat (total of 8 boats) advanced to the semifinals. The remaining boats (9 boats) were eliminated.
 Semifinals: Two heats. Each heat consisted of 6 boats. The top three boats in each heat advanced to the "A" final; the other three boats in each heat were sent to a "B" final (7th–12th place classification race).
 Finals: A main final (Final A) and a 7th–12th place classification race (Final B).

Schedule

All times are Central European Time (UTC+1)

Results

Quarterfinals

The top crew in each heat advanced to the semifinals, with all others sent to the repechages.

Quarterfinal 1

Quarterfinal 2

Quarterfinal 3

Quarterfinal 4

Repechages
Top two finishers in each heat advanced to semi-finals.

Repechage heat 1

Repechage heat 2

Repechage heat 3

Repechage heat 4

Semifinals

The top three finishers in each heat advanced to Final A; others went to Final B.

Semifinal 1

Semifinal 2

Finals

Final B

Final A

References

Rowing at the 1972 Summer Olympics